Hermann Eisner (December 29, 1898 - September 18, 1969) was a member of the Wisconsin State Assembly from 1949 to 1950. He was an unsuccessful candidate for the Wisconsin State Senate in 1956 and in the Republican primary for the Assembly in 1958. Eisner was born on December 29, 1898, in Austria.

References

Austro-Hungarian emigrants to the United States
Republican Party members of the Wisconsin State Assembly
1898 births
1969 deaths